Howes Lubricator is a manufacturer of oils, fuel additives and multi purpose lubricant. It was established in 1920 by Wendell V.C. Howes.

References

External links 
 Howes Lubricator American Website
 Howes Lubricator European Website

Automotive companies of the United States
Chemical companies established in 1920
Companies based in Rhode Island
North Kingstown, Rhode Island